Wafula is a male forename and a surname of African origin for abaluhya tribe in kenya which means a boy born during rainy season. The opposite is Nafula for a lady who also born during rainy season

Persons with the given name 

 Wafula Chebukati (born 1961), Kenyan politician
 Wafula Oguttu (born 1952), Ugandan journalist and politician
 Wafula Wabuge (1927–1996), Kenyan politician
 Wafula Wamunyinyi, Kenyan politician

Persons with the surname 

 Anne Wafula Strike (born 1969), Kenyan-born British Paralympic wheelchair racer
 Azziad Nasenya Wafula (born 2000), Kenyan actress, content creator, radio host and social media personality
 Jonathan Wafula (born 1994), Kenyan footballer

See also 

 Waiola Church

Given names
Surnames
Masculine given names
Surnames of African origin